The Standard Joe is an album by American jazz saxophonist Joe Henderson recorded in 1991 and released on the Red label. It features Henderson in a trio with bassist Rufus Reid and drummer Al Foster.

Reception 

The Allmusic review states "This Italian import is particularly recommended to listeners not that familiar with Henderson's playing, for he brings new life to these often overplayed compositions".

Track listing 
 "Blue Bossa" (Kenny Dorham) – 9:16
 "Inner Urge" (Joe Henderson) – 9:35
 "Body and Soul" [take 1] (Johnny Green, Frank Eyton, Edward Heyman, Robert Sour) – 12:45
 "Take the "A" Train" (Billy Strayhorn) – 8:48
 "'Round Midnight" (Thelonious Monk, Cootie Williams, Bernie Hanighen) – 8:42
 "Blues in F (In 'n Out)" (Henderson) – 5:20
 "Body and Soul" [take 2] (Green, Eyton, Heyman, Sour) – 13:26

Personnel 
Joe Henderson – tenor saxophone
Rufus Reid – bass
Al Foster – drums

References 

Red Records albums
Joe Henderson albums
1979 albums